The Axelgold Range is a subrange of the Hogem Ranges of the Omineca Mountains, located between Ominicetla Creek and upper Omineca River in northern British Columbia, Canada.

External links

Axelgold Range in the Canadian Mountain Encyclopedia

Omineca Mountains